Gervase is a masculine given name which may refer to:

Pre-modern era
Ordered chronologically
 Gervase of Besançon (died 685), saint and a bishop of Besançon
 Gervase of Bazoches (died 1108), Prince of Galilee
 Gervase of Blois (died c. 1157), Abbot of Westminster in England
 Gervase of Canterbury (c. 1141–c. 1210), English chronicler
 Gervase de Cornhill (c. 1110–c. 1183), Anglo-Norman royal official and sheriff
 Gervase of Tilbury (c. 1150–c. 1228), English chronicler
 Gervase of Ebstorf, author of the Ebstorf Map created c. 1234; possibly the same man as Gervase of Tilbury
 Gervase Alard (1270–1340), Admiral of the Cinque Ports Fleet and Admiral of the Western Fleet of the English Navy

Modern era
Ordered alphabetically
 Gervase Babington (1549/1550–1610), Bishop of Llandaff, Bishop of Exeter and Bishop of Worcester
 Gervase Beckett (1866–1937), British banker and Member of Parliament
 Gervase de Peyer (born 1926), English clarinettist and conductor
 Gervase Elwes (1866–1921), English tenor
 Sir Gervase Elwes, 1st Baronet (1628–1706), English Member of Parliament
 Gervase Elwes, junior (c. 1657–c. 1687), English Member of Parliament, son of the 1st baronet
 Gervase Holles (1607–1675), English lawyer, antiquarian and Member of Parliament
 Gervase Jackson-Stops (1947–1995), English architectural historian
 Gervase Markham (1568?–1637), English poet and writer
 Gervase Peterson (born 1969), American contestant on the show Survivor
 Gervase Phinn (born 1946), English educator

Fictional characters
 Gervase Fen, fictional detective in novels by Edmund Crispin

See also 
 Gervasio
 Gervais (disambiguation)
 Gervaise (disambiguation)

Masculine given names